Clayton, Massachusetts is the southernmost community in Berkshire County, Massachusetts. It is part of the town of New Marlborough.

References 

Populated places in Berkshire County, Massachusetts
New Marlborough, Massachusetts